Los Grandes Éxitos de Marco Antonio Solís y Los Bukis: Recuerdos, Tristeza y Soledad  (Eng.: "Memories, Sadness and Loneliness") is a compilation album released by Marco Antonio Solís on August 11, 1998. "Recuerdos, Tristeza y Soledad" is also a song that was released from his first studio album En Pleno Vuelo. This compilation album of his greatest hits are from his first two studio albums En Pleno Vuelo and Marco along with albums from when he was with Los Bukis. The album was certified gold in Mexico by AMPROFON.

Track listing
All songs written and composed by Marco Antonio Solís

References

External links
Official website
 Recuerdos, Tristeza Y Soledad on music.barnesandnoble.com

1998 compilation albums
Marco Antonio Solís compilation albums
Fonovisa Records compilation albums